Piers Hans-Peter Baker is a British cartoonist best known for his comic strip Ollie and Quentin, distributed by King Features Syndicate, about the curious activities of a seagull and a lugworm.

Early life and education 
The eldest of five children, Baker was a student in Surrey and Somerset. During a year of volunteer work in Egypt, he survived a plane crash. Back in the UK, he began studying at the Epsom School of Art. After he accidentally left his artwork on a train, he chose to leave college and instead seek employment.

Design and illustration
He began his career as the junior member of a small advertising agency where he developed his graphic design skills and eventually launched his own graphic design firm, specialising in food packaging illustration and design. As he recalled, "In the years following, I helped run a small design agency where my specialty was designing ice lolly wrappers for Wall's Ice Cream. Much of my work can still be seen in trash cans around the UK and Europe. In 2000, I decided to pursue my lifelong ambition of becoming a cartoon illustrator and worked as an illustrator of children’s schoolbooks."

Comic strips
In 2002, he created Ollie and Quentin for the Royal National Lifeboat Institution. Four years later, it was selected by King Features for international distribution beginning January 7. 2008. Interviewed by Janine Pineo for the Bangor Daily News, Baker explained the strip's development:
"This was the first time I’d submitted any strip to King Features. That said, I’ve been working on Ollie and Quentin for many years and didn’t want to submit it until I felt it was strong enough. I know they receive 6,000 submissions a year and only launch three or four, so I could only send them something I was really happy with. I decided a long time ago to take the slow, steady approach. My plan was to get a weekly strip running in a few small UK papers and then see if a daily version was possible. I’d say it took three years or 150 strips before I felt I was ready. We don’t have cartoon syndicates in the U.K. so as King Features is the world’s premier cartoon syndication company, I thought I’d start there. I sent a submission in the summer of 2006 and heard back in October that same year when I’d completely forgotten about it. From then until now I have been in 'development', speaking to my brilliant editor, Brendan Burford, once a week to go through the rough strips I’ve sent him."

His strips were collected in the book Ollie and Quentin, published December 2011.

Ollie and Quentin can also be seen on Go Comics

Whiteboard Animation
Baker is a leading whiteboard animation artist and currently runs Doodle Whiteboard.

Personal life 
Standing six-feet six inches tall, Baker was a champion 400m runner in his youth. He was an 'extra' in the 1981 film Chariots of Fire and can be seen as part of the crowd in the famous courtyard scene that recreates the Trinity Great Court Run. He lives and works in Manchester.

References

External links
Piers Baker interview

British cartoonists
Living people
1962 births